The 1987 NCAA Division I Men's Soccer Tournament was the 28th organized men's college soccer tournament by the National Collegiate Athletic Association, to determine the top college soccer team in the United States. The Clemson Tigers won their second national title by defeating the San Diego State Aztecs, 2–0, in the championship game. The final match was played on December 6, 1987, in Clemson, South Carolina, at Riggs Field.  All the other games were played at the home field of the higher seeded team.

Early rounds
Home teams are indicated by *

College Cup – Riggs Field, Clemson, South Carolina

Semifinals

Final

Notes

References

NCAA Division I Men's Soccer Tournament seasons
Championship
NCAA Division I Mens Soccer
NCAA Division I Men's Soccer Tournament
NCAA Division I Men's Soccer Tournament